MiniDVD (also Mini DVD or miniDVD) is a DVD disc which is  in diameter. The most common MiniDVDs are single layered, which can hold 1.46 GB of data, however, there also exists  dual layered 2.6 GB versions, dual sided single layer 2.8 GB versions, and dual sided dual layer 5.2 GB versions. The MiniDVD is also known as a "3 inch DVD", referring to its approximate diameter in inches.

The 8 cm optical disc format was originally used for music CD singles, hence the commonly used names CD single and miniCD. Similarly, the manufactured 8 cm DVDs were originally used for music videos and as such became known as DVD single.

MiniDVD capacities
Recordable 8 cm discs are commonly used in DVD-based camcorders. The most common MiniDVDs are single layered and hold 1.4 GB of data, but there are variants that can offer up to 5.2 GB of storage space, through a combination of dual layers and dual sides. Mini DVDs are also available in +R, +R DS, +R DL, +R DL DS, +RW, +RW DS, -R, -R DS, -R DL, -R DL DS, -RW, and -RW DS variants, just like their full sized counterparts. (DL=Double Layer, DS=Double Sided). A double sided MiniDVD can hold 2.8 GB of data (1.4 GB x 2), however, a dual-layer MiniDVD can only hold 2.6 GB of data due to the limitations when manufacturing dual layered discs. A double sided dual layered disc can hold 5.2 GB of data (2.6 GB x 2), with the MiniDVD-RAM version of the double sided, dual layer disc being able to hold 5.6 GB of data (2.8GB x 2).

Variants of MiniDVD
Nintendo used a very similar disc-based format for the GameCube. This format is also supported by the Wii for backward compatibility with the GameCube, however unofficial homebrew is required to use this feature on later Wii models.

See also
Blu-ray Disc
CD Video
DVD
DVD card
HD DVD
LaserDisc
Nintendo optical discs
GD-ROM
Universal Media Disc (UMD)
Video CD (VCD)
VideoNow

References

External links 

miniDVD definition on AfterDawn.com

80 mm discs
Video storage
DVD
Optical computer storage media